The 2008-09 All-American Hockey Association season was the first season of the All-American Hockey Association. Five teams participated in the regular season, and the Chi-Town Shooters were the league champions. The Detroit Dragons folded mid-season.

Regular season

Playoffs

External links
 Season 2008/09 on hockeydb.com

All American Hockey League (2008–2011)
AAHA